Laurence Parisot (born 31 August 1959 in Luxeuil-les-Bains, Haute-Saône) is a French businesswoman who served as head of the French MEDEF employers' union from 2005 until 2013. She also directs the IFOP poll institute. She became the 276th wealthiest French person after she inherited the Parisot group (first furnishing retail group in France).

Family 
Her father and grandfather Jacques Parisot (who set up the business) led the Parisot group, an unquoted furnishing retail company.  She is single and has no children.

Education
Parisot studied public law in Nancy University and then entered Sciences Po. In 1986, she was nominated director of the Louis Harris Institute poll.

Career
Since 1990, Parisot has been chief executive of the IFOP poll institute after she bought 75% of its capital. She has also been a member of BNP Paribas board since 1990.

Head of the MEDEF 

In 2003, Parisot entered the MEDEF executive board. On 5 July 2005 she beat two other candidates in a vote to replace Ernest-Antoine Seillière. At the time, she was the youngest ever head of the business lobby and the first one to run a service company. During her time in office, Parisot declared that she intended to fight against unemployment and put “enterprise at the center of French society”. She added that she would work very hard to push French MPs to adopt more liberal labour legislation. In 2013, Parisot lost an internal battle to alter the group’s statutes and extend her eight-year term; instead, she was replaced with Pierre Gattaz.

Later career
In 2014, Parisot declared her interest in succeeding Henri Proglio as CEO of French state utility Électricité de France (EDF); instead, the position went to Jean-Bernard Lévy. In 2018, she was appointed by U.S. bank Citigroup as chairwoman and managing director of its French unit.

Other activities

Corporate boards
 Électricité de France (EDF), Member of Board of Directors (since 2014)
 BNP Paribas, Member of the Board of Directors (2006-2018)
 Ernst & Young, Member of the Advisory Board
 Michelin, Independent Member of Board of Directors (2005-2015)
 Coface, Independent Member of Board of Directors (2007-2014)
 Havas, Member of Board of Directors (2005-2006)
 Disneyland Paris, Independent Member of Board of Directors (2000-2006)

Non-profit organizations
 European Council on Foreign Relations (ECFR), Member
 International Crisis Group (ICG), Board of Trustees (since 2012)
 Open Society Foundations, Member of the European Advisory Board

Recognition
Parisot was awarded the Ordre national du Mérite.

Personal life
Parisot is single and lives in Paris.

References 
(FR) Translated from the French version

1959 births
Chevaliers of the Légion d'honneur
French billionaires
20th-century French businesswomen
20th-century French businesspeople
21st-century French businesswomen
21st-century French businesspeople
Living people
Officers of the Ordre national du Mérite
People from Luxeuil-les-Bains
Sciences Po alumni